Collected Works is the first compilation album by Australian rock group, Hunters & Collectors. It was issued on 19 November 1990 by Mushroom Records' White Label and includes material from their previous six studio albums as well as a re-recording of "Throw Your Arms Around Me", which was released as a single. The album peaked at No. 6 on the ARIA Albums Chart and No. 26 on the New Zealand Albums Chart.

Background 
Hunters & Collectors celebrated ten years since their formation with the release of their first compilation album, Collected Works, on 19 November 1990. It appeared on the White Label imprint of Mushroom Records. The group's founding mainstays were John Archer (bass guitar), Doug Falconer (drums) and Mark Seymour (guitar and lead vocals). They were joined by Robert Miles (sound engineer) and Ray Tosti-Gueira on guitar and backing vocals. By September 1980 they had added Geoff Crosby on keyboards and Greg Perano (ex-True Wheels) on percussion.

The core of Hunters & Collectors was expanded by a brass section, later dubbed Horns of Contempt, including Michael Waters on trombone; Jack Howard on trumpet; and Jeremy Smith on French horn. By July 1982 Tosti-Gueira was replaced by Martin Lubran (ex-Spiny Norman) on guitar. In early 1988 Barry Palmer (Harem Scarem, ex-Stephen Cummings Band) joined the group on guitar.

This album's slower acoustic version of "Throw Your Arms Around Me" had been recorded in 1989 (at the same time as sessions for their sixth studio album, Ghost Nation) and was co-produced by Hunters & Collectors with Clive Martin, and was mixed by Eric "E.T" Thorngren. It was released as a single in November 1990 and reached No. 34 on the ARIA Singles Chart. This was the third time the group had issued "Throw Your Arms Around Me" as a single. The group's first video album, of the same name, was released simultaneously on VHS. It comprised 14 music videos and three live tracks, the latter had been recorded at The Venue, Melbourne on 24 and 25 August 1984.

To support the album's appearance the group undertook a national Collected Works Tour for two months into January the following year. Seymour told Bevan Hannan of The Canberra Times, that the tour was "an interruption in a manner of speaking. We're actually in the process of writing an album which we are meant to be recording in April or May. But it's been really good, much better than anything we've done before as far as crowd sizes".

On the record liner notes Seymour states "This record documents ten years of Hunters and Collectors music. It includes material from every 'period', including those times when the band's popularity waned, music that few people have heard, and music that some may have forgotten". It was also released overseas by I.R.S. Records, with a different track listing, as it only featured material recorded during the time the band was signed with that label. The United Kingdom version included "Stuck on You" instead of "Talking to a Stranger".

Reception 

Penelope Layland of The Canberra Times felt the album was an "excellent compilation ... a double album of well-chosen, quality tracks ... must rate as one of the best-value Christmas present in the record stores this summer". Allmusic's Mike DeGagne described the United States version on I.R.S. Records, which "takes the best tracks from the first ten years of the band's existence and lays them out in chronological order, resulting in a wonderful compilation".

Track listing

Personnel 

Credited to:

Hunters & Collectors members
 John Archer – bass guitar
 Geoff Crosby – keyboards, Korg MS-20, effects
 Doug Falconer – drums, percussion
 Robert Miles – live sound, art director
 Greg Perano – percussion
 Mark Seymour – guitar, lead vocals
 Ray Tosti-Guerra – guitar, backing vocals
 Martin Lubran – guitar
 Barry Palmer – lead guitar

Horns of Contempt members
 Nigel Crocker – trombone
 Jack Howard – trumpet, keyboards, backing vocals
 Andy Lynn – trumpet
 Chris Malherbe – trumpet
 Jeremy Smith – French horn, keyboards, guitar
 Michael Waters – trombone, keyboards

Production details
 Producer – Hunters & Collectors, Konrad Plank, Mike Howlett, Gavin MacKillop, Greg Edward, Clive Martin

Charts

Certifications

References 

1990 albums
Hunters & Collectors albums
Albums produced by Conny Plank
Albums produced by Mike Howlett
Mushroom Records compilation albums